Howard William Meeker  (November 4, 1923 – November 8, 2020) was a Canadian professional hockey player in the National Hockey League, youth coach and educator in ice hockey, and a Progressive Conservative Member of Parliament. He became best known to Canadians as an excitable and enthusiastic television colour commentator for Hockey Night in Canada, breaking down strategy in between periods of games with early use of the telestrator.

In the NHL, he won the Calder Memorial Trophy as best rookie, is one of the few professional players to score five goals in a game, and won four Stanley Cups, all with the Toronto Maple Leafs. He was given the Order of Canada, and is in the Ontario Sports Hall of Fame, and the Hockey Hall of Fame as a broadcaster.

Meeker was the last surviving member of the Maple Leafs 1947 Stanley Cup team, the Maple Leafs 1949 Stanley Cup team, the Maple Leafs 1951 Stanley Cup team, and the inaugural NHL All-Star Game.

Biography

Early life
Meeker was born in Kitchener, Ontario, the son of Kathleen Wharnsby and Charles Howard Meeker, and raised in New Hamburg, Ontario He played his junior hockey with the Kitchener Greenshirts in the Ontario Hockey Association. In 1941–42, Meeker joined the Stratford Kist. In only 13 games, he scored 29 goals and had 45 points, helping the Kist win the OHA Junior-B title.  He played one more year of junior hockey before joining the Canadian Army. Meeker was badly injured during the war, but he made a full recovery. In 1945–46, after World War II had ended, Meeker returned to the OHA and played one season with the Stratford Indians.

Professional career
Meeker was a right winger. In 1946–47, he joined the Toronto Maple Leafs in the National Hockey League. He scored 27 goals and 45 points during his NHL debut and he was awarded the Calder Memorial Trophy. Meeker also played in the 1947 NHL All-Star Game and he also tied an NHL record for most goals by a rookie in one game with five goals against the Chicago Black Hawks. Meeker also won his first Stanley Cup with the Leafs that season, the first of three consecutive Stanley Cups. The season, however, would prove Meeker's best as a pro, and he would never again approach that level of scoring.

In 1947–48, Meeker scored 34 points in 58 games and played in the 1948 NHL All-Star Game. He also helped the Leafs win their second consecutive Stanley Cup. Next season, Meeker sustained a collarbone injury that limited him to only 30 games and he did not play a single game in the playoffs as the Leafs took their third consecutive Stanley Cup. In 1950–51, Meeker won his fourth Stanley Cup with the Leafs as they beat the Montreal Canadiens in five games. Meeker would play three more seasons with the Leafs before retiring from the NHL. He continued to play hockey sporadically for 15 more years with different senior clubs, finally retiring from playing in 1969.

Coaching and general management
He also coached the Maple Leafs, replacing King Clancy on April 11, 1956, leading the Leafs to a 21–34–15 record. He was promoted to general manager in 1957, but was fired before the start of the 1957–58 season.

Political career

Meeker spent two years as a Progressive Conservative MP while playing for the Leafs. In June 1951, Meeker won the federal by-election in the Ontario riding of Waterloo South. He did not seek re-election in the 1953 election.

Hockey camps
Meeker later ran hockey schools as summer camps in Canada and the United States. His book Howie Meeker's Hockey Basics, published in 1973, and his weekly telecasts based on these camps, Howie Meeker's Hockey School, which ran from 1973 to 1977 on CBC Television, cemented his reputation in the coaching trade. The TV show was produced in St. John's, Newfoundland. It featured boys learning the basic skills about the game: skating, puck control and passing. Meeker's encouragement and delivery were all based on his premise that the game was suffering from poor instruction at the junior levels. He felt the game was not being taught properly so his message was directed at coaches across Canada. He also made vocal and detailed complaints about poor quality hockey equipment for child players, especially concerning protective gear. The television series had 107 fifteen-minute episodes. It was produced and directed by Ron Harrison and/or John Spaulding and aired weekly during the hockey season.

Broadcasting career
In the 1970s and 1980s, Meeker became known to a new generation of hockey fans as an excitable, dynamic  analyst-colour commentator on Hockey Night in Canada. He would replay footage taken from an overhead camera that provided a full view of the ice, then use a telestrator to demonstrate his points.  During the telestrator segments, his favourite directive was, "stop it right here", to freeze the screen in order to analyze specifics in the replay. He also worked on Vancouver Canucks telecasts on BCTV. When TSN gained NHL cable TV broadcast rights in 1987, Meeker joined their team, where he stayed until retiring in 1998. Meeker often used the phrase, "Keep your stick on the ice" (later popularized as a slogan of comedian Red Green) during his educational segments on Hockey Night in Canada.

Philanthropic work
Meeker was involved with Special Olympics for over 40 years. He helped launch Special Olympics Canada after being invited to participate by former NHL referee Harry "Red" Foster shortly after the Special Olympics movement was created by Eunice Kennedy Shriver in the United States. In 1988, at the age of 64, Meeker was contacted by Campbell River Special Olympics in Campbell River, British Columbia, to help with setting up a fundraising golf tournament for the local Special Olympics organization. He was initially serving as a go-between to get a regional sports star involved but eventually, Meeker himself lent his name and support to the Howie Meeker Charity Golf Classic at Storey Creek Golf Club. Each year for the next 30 years, Meeker participated in the successful fundraiser in person. In his 94th year and at the 30th running of the event in August 2018, it was announced that Meeker would be taking a step back and welcome a new co-host to carry on with the event. NHL player Clayton Stoner had signed on to be co-host with Meeker to ensure the fundraiser continues in Meeker's name into the future.

In 2004, Meeker was invited to headline a golf tournament fundraiser to benefit BC Guide Dog Services. Originally intended as a one-off event, it was such a success that the Howie Meeker Golf for Guide Dogs tournament ran on Vancouver Island for four years, and is now held annually in the Metro Vancouver area. From this beginning, Meeker and his wife, Leah, became the patrons for BC Guide Dog Services, and through their involvement had helped raise over $350,000 as of July 2011.

Personal life
Meeker moved to St. John's, Newfoundland, later in life, calling it home for several decades. He was married to his first wife Grace for 55 years, raising six children, until her death in 1998. After retiring, Meeker lived with his second wife Leah in Parksville, British Columbia. He died on November 8, 2020, in hospital in Nanaimo, British Columbia.

Tribute
Upon hearing of Meeker's death, NHL commissioner Gary Bettman issued the following statement on behalf of the league: "Howie Meeker spent his long and remarkable life playing, teaching and broadcasting the game of hockey and serving his country with incredible enthusiasm."

Awards and achievements
OHA 1942 season: Scored 29 goals and had 45 points in 13 games.
Calder Memorial Trophy winner in 1947.
Played in 1947, 1948 and 1949 NHL All-Star Games.
Stanley Cup champion in 1947, 1948, 1949, and 1951.
On January 8, 1947, Meeker scored 5 goals in a game against the Chicago Blackhawks.
Foster Hewitt Memorial Award winner in 1998 for "Excellence in Hockey Broadcasting"
Inducted into the Hockey Hall of Fame in 1998 as a broadcaster.
 On December 30, 2010, Meeker was named a Member of the Order of Canada.
 In 2010, Meeker was inducted into the Ontario Sports Hall of Fame.
Was the fastest Maple Leafs player to score 25 goals (surpassed by Auston Matthews).

Career statistics 
Sources:

Coaching record
Source:

See also
 List of players with 5 or more goals in an NHL game

References

External links
 
 Howie Meeker official website 
 
 CBC Digital Archives – Howie Meeker Hockey School

1923 births
2020 deaths
Brantford Lions players
Calder Trophy winners
Canadian ice hockey coaches
Canadian ice hockey right wingers
Canadian military personnel of World War II
Canadian sportsperson-politicians
Canadian television sportscasters
Foster Hewitt Memorial Award winners
Ice hockey people from Ontario
Members of the House of Commons of Canada from Ontario
Members of the Order of Canada
National Hockey League broadcasters
Pittsburgh Hornets coaches
Pittsburgh Hornets players
Politicians from Kitchener, Ontario
Progressive Conservative Party of Canada MPs
Sportspeople from Kitchener, Ontario
Stanley Cup champions
Toronto Maple Leafs coaches
Toronto Maple Leafs players
Vancouver Canucks announcers
World Hockey Association broadcasters